Reg Twite (29 April 1911 – 21 September 1995) was an Australian rules footballer who played with Essendon in the Victorian Football League (VFL).

Notes

External links 
		

1911 births
1995 deaths
Australian rules footballers from Victoria (Australia)
Essendon Football Club players